Sibyla was a town of ancient Cilicia, inhabited in Byzantine times.

Its site is located near Yıldız, Asiatic Turkey.

References

Populated places in ancient Cilicia
Former populated places in Turkey
Populated places of the Byzantine Empire
History of Mersin Province